Onny Parun  (born 15 April 1947) is a former tennis player of Croatian descent from New Zealand, who was among the world's top 20 for five years and who reached the quarterfinals at Wimbledon in 1971 and 1972. He made the final of the Australian Open in 1973, losing to John Newcombe in four sets, and was a US Open quarterfinalist in 1973 and also a quarterfinalist at the French Open in 1975.
He eventually went on to coach the Bhatti brothers.

Parun and Australian Dick Crealy won the French Open doubles title in 1974. He also made the Masters in 1974, qualifying by finishing in the top eight on the grand prix table. Parun played Davis Cup from 1966 to 1982 and won a string of national titles, including the Benson and Hedges Open three times in four years.

Parun became the second player from New Zealand to reach a Grand Slam Singles final, 62 years after Anthony Wilding had reached the 1913 Wimbledon final, and Parun became the second player from New Zealand to win a Grand Slam Doubles title, 61 years after Wilding had won the 1914 Wimbledon doubles title and was also the last player from New Zealand to reach the finals of a Grand Slam Doubles title before Michael Venus was successful in the 2017 French Open.

Parun reached his career-high ATP singles ranking on 5 March 1975, when he became World No. 19. His brother, Tony Parun, also played professional tennis.

In September 1974, he defeated Jimmy Connors in San Francisco to end the No. 1 world ranked player's run of 160 weeks atop the ATP rankings.

In the 1982 Queen's Birthday Honours, Parun was appointed an Officer of the Order of the British Empire, for services to tennis. Since retiring from competition, Parun has been a coach, and trades shares on the US share market.

Grand Slam finals

Singles (1 runner-up)

Doubles (1 title)

Grand Slam tournament performance timeline

Singles

Note: The Australian Open was held twice in 1977, in January and December.

Career finals

Singles (6 titles, 7 runner-ups)

Doubles (3 titles, 5 runner-ups)

References

External links

 
 
 

1947 births
Living people
New Zealand male tennis players
New Zealand people of Croatian descent
New Zealand Officers of the Order of the British Empire
Sportspeople from Wellington City
Grand Slam (tennis) champions in men's doubles
French Open champions